Hartshill and Basford Halt was a railway station located between the Stoke-on-Trent and Newcastle-under-Lyme stations on the Market Drayton branch of the North Staffordshire Railway, approx  east of Newcastle.

It closed in 1926.

Present day

The tunnel between Newcastle-Under-Lyme and Hartshill and Basford Halt has been filled in and built on by housing and small commercial units.

References
Notes

Sources

Disused railway stations in Staffordshire
Former North Staffordshire Railway stations
Railway stations in Great Britain opened in 1905
Railway stations in Great Britain closed in 1926